Allium blandum is a species of onion native to northern India, Pakistan, Afghanistan, Tajikistan, Nepal and the Xinjiang region of western China. It grows in the mountains at elevations of 3000–5000 m.

Allium blandum produces an egg-shaped bulb up to 2 cm in diameter. Scape is round in cross-section, up to 30 cm tall. Leaves are narrow, flat, up to 20 cm long. Umbel is spherical with many red flowers.

References

blandum
Flora of temperate Asia
Plants described in 1832
Onions